The Battle of Melantias or Battle of Melanthius (Greek: Μάχη τής Μελαντιάς), which took place in 559, was a battle between the armies of the Kutrigurs, commanded by Zabergan, and the Byzantine Empire, under the able and skilled command of general Belisarius. Though substantially outnumbered, the Byzantine army decisively won the battle and forced the Kutrigurs to withdraw in bad order. This was the last battle in which Belisarius commanded a force.

Background
During the winter of 558, Zabergan led a substantial Kutrigur army which crossed the frozen Danube. This army invaded Moesia and Thrace, threatening Constantinople itself. Emperor Justinian I recalled Belisarius from retirement. Belisarius led a small force of 300 veterans, together with locally raised levies, to drive the Kutrigurs from the Theodosian Walls.

The Battle 
Belisarius decided to advance to meet the Kutrigurs and set up his camp a few kilometers from his opponent in Melantias, a settlement about 20 miles from Constantinople. Zabergan wanted to take the Byzantines by surprise and left his camp with 2,000 horsemen, but he was in turn taken by surprise by Belisarius. Upon encountering the Byzantines, the horsemen began to close in on the limited front of veterans but were then attacked by hidden wings of slingers and javelin men. This caused the riders ranks to close and become entangled in a mass. At this point, according to the Byzantine historian Agathias, Belisarius used a stratagem to make the Kutrigurs believe that they were facing a sizeable force; he asked local peasants to scatter in the forest and hit the trees to make a lot of dust in order to scare the horses of the Kutrigurs. The unit of Kutrigurs who approached the area panicked and many were killed.

Aftermath
Defeated, the Kutrigurs and their Slav allies retreated. They briefly continued to plunder Thrace before crossing the Danube and returning to their homeland.

References

Further reading
 

Melantias
550s in the Byzantine Empire
559
Melantias
Kutrigurs
Justinian I